Wealth Without a Future (Italian: Ricchezza senza domani) is a 1939 Italian drama film directed by Ferdinando Maria Poggioli and starring Lamberto Picasso, Paola Borboni and Doris Duranti. A wealthy industrialist retires to live in the countryside.

Cast

References

Bibliography 
 Moliterno, Gino. Historical Dictionary of Italian Cinema. Scarecrow Press, 2008.

External links 

1939 films
Italian drama films
1939 drama films
1930s Italian-language films
Films directed by Ferdinando Maria Poggioli
Italian black-and-white films
1930s Italian films